An incomplete list of events in India in 1615:

Events
Thomas Roe came to Mughal India as ambassador from James I of United Kingdom.

 
1615